Of Empires Forlorn is a studio album by the American doom metal band While Heaven Wept. The album was released in three different editions by three different labels. The Eibon Records version contains the instrumental track "From Empires to Oceans," while the Rage of Achilles Records and Rock Machine Records editions contain the track "In Aeturnum."  The only other differences between the three are minor aspects of the front cover and the formatting of the liner notes/lyrics.

Track listing
"The Drowning Years" – 5:41
"Of Empires Forlorn" – 7:49
"Voice in the Wind" – 6:25
"In Aeturnum" – 7:30 (Omitted on the Eibon Records version)
"Soulsadness" – 7:24
"Epistle No. 81" – 3:24
"Sorrow of the Angels" – 4:47
"From Empires to Oceans" – 7:18 (Only on Eibon Records version)

Credits
Tom Phillips – guitars, vocals, and keyboards
Jim Hunter – bass
Jason Gray – drums
Scott Loose – guitars

Additional keyboards by Michelle Loose and Jake Bordnar.

Recorded at Assembly Line Studios, February 2002 - June 2003. Produced, engineered, and mixed by Kevin 131.  Mastered by Bill Wolf Productions.

2003 albums